The Pteriida are an order of large and medium-sized marine  bivalve mollusks.  It includes five families, among them the Pteriidae (pearl oysters and winged oysters).

2010 taxonomy
In 2010, a new proposed classification system for the Bivalvia was published by Bieler, Carter & Coan, revising the classification of the Bivalvia, including the suborder Pteriida.

Superfamily Ambonychioidea
Family †Alatoconchidae
Family †Ambonychiidae
Family †Lunulacardiidae
Family †Monopteriidae
Family †Myalinidae
Family †Mysidiellidae
Family †Ramonalinidae
Superfamily Pinnoidea
Family Pinnidae
Superfamily †Posidonioidea Neumayr, 1891
Family †Posidoniidae Neumayr, 1891 (Devonian to Cretaceous)
Family †Aulacomyellidae Ichikawa, 1958
Family †Daonellidae Neumayr, 1891
Family †Halobiidae Kittl, 1912 (Devonian to Triassic)
Superfamily Pterioidea
Family †Bakevelliidae (Triassic to Eocene)
Family †Cassianellidae (Middle to Late Triassic)
Family †Kochiidae
Family Malleidae
Family †Pergamidiidae (Triassic to Cretaceous)
Family †Plicatostylidae (Jurassic)
Family †Posidoniidae
Family †Pterineidae
Family Pteriidae
Family Pulvinitidae
Family †Retroceramidae
Superfamily †Rhombopterioidea Korobkov in Eberzin, 1960
Family †Rhombopteriidae Korobkov in Eberzin, 1960 (Silurian to Devonian)
Family †Umburridae P. A. Johnston, 1991 (Silurian)

References 

 
Bivalve orders